Romanization is the representation in the Latin alphabet of a language normally written in another writing system.
Romanization may also refer to:

Romanization (cultural), the expansion of Roman culture, law, and language
Latinisation of names, practice of rendering a non-Latin name (or word) in a Latin style
Latinisation in the Soviet Union, the Latinization of languages inside the former USSR
Romanization (religious), the practice of modifying other rites of the Catholic Church (or even of Orthodox churches) to more resemble the Latin (Roman) rite; the proper term is liturgical Latinisation
Representation in roman type of formerly italicized foreign words and phrases after they have become assimilated into English

See also
 Roma (disambiguation)
 Latinisation (disambiguation)